Goodwater is a town in Coosa County, Alabama, United States. At the 2020 census, the population was 1,291. It is part of the Talladega-Sylacauga Micropolitan Statistical Area.

Geography

Climate
According to the Köppen climate classification, Goodwater has a humid subtropical climate (abbreviated Cfa).

Demographics

2020 census

As of the 2020 United States census, there were 1,291 people, 484 households, and 230 families residing in the town.

2010 census
At the 2010 census there were 1,475 people, 618 households, and 394 families living in the city. The racial makeup of the city was 73.7% Black or African American, 24.3% White, 0.7% Native American, 0.0% Asian, 0.7% from other races, and 0.5% from two or more races. 0.7% of the population were Hispanic or Latino of any race.
The age distribution was 22.2% under the age of 18, 6.8% from 18 to 24, 22.9% from 25 to 44, 28.3% from 45 to 64, and 19.7% 65 or older. The median age was 43.6 years. For every 100 females, there were 88.1 males. For every 100 females age 18 and over, there were 90.4 males.

The median household income was $24,909 and the median family income  was $31,081. Males had a median income of $24,554 versus $24,348 for females. The per capita income for the city was $12,957. About 23.6% of families and 28.2% of the population were below the poverty line, including 48.2% of those under age 18 and 18.3% of those age 65 or over.

2000 census
At the 2000 census there were 1,633 people, 621 households, and 424 families living in the city. The racial makeup of the city was 73.30% Black or African American, 25.66% White, 0.31% Native American, 0.12% Asian, 0.06% from other races, and 0.55% from two or more races. 0.55% of the population were Hispanic or Latino of any race.
The age distribution was 25.3% under the age of 18, 8.3% from 18 to 24, 25.3% from 25 to 44, 23.4% from 45 to 64, and 17.8% 65 or older. The median age was 38 years. For every 100 females, there were 87.5 males. For every 100 females age 18 and over, there were 80.7 males.

The median household income was $22,188 and the median family income  was $28,819. Males had a median income of $22,414 versus $17,464 for females. The per capita income for the city was $10,602. About 21.0% of families and 23.3% of the population were below the poverty line, including 33.8% of those under age 18 and 12.0% of those age 65 or over.

Notable people
 Robert Daniel Carmichael, mathematician for whom Carmichael numbers are named
 Colonel Hartley A. Moon, adjutant general of Alabama
 Jamario Moon, professional basketball player
 Xavier Moon, professional basketball player

Photo Gallery

References 

Towns in Alabama
Towns in Coosa County, Alabama
Alexander City micropolitan area